Christian Venge Balboa (born 1 December 1972 in Barcelona) is a cyclist from Spain.

Personal 
He has a vision impairment. In 2013, he was awarded the gold Real Orden al Mérito Deportivo.

Cycling 
Venge competed at the 2000 Summer Paralympics in cycling.  He was the third cyclist to finish in the blind men's Tandem Individual Pursuit track race. He competed at the 2004 Summer Paralympics in cycling.  He was the second cyclist to finish in the men's blind Combined Road race. He competed at the 2008 Summer Paralympics in cycling.  He was the first cyclist to finish in the Tandem Time Trial Road race. He was the second cyclists to finish in the Tandem Individual Pursuit track race.  He competed at the 2012 Summer Paralympics in cycling.  He was the first cyclist to finish in the Road Trial race.   His pilot for the 2012 Games was David Llaurado.  All told, he has earned five Paralympic medals. He also represented the Spain at the 2020 Summer Paralympics held in Tokyo, Japan.

In 2009, while riding with David Llaurado as his pilot, he won a gold medal at the IPC Road Cycling World Championships.

From the Catalan region of Spain, he was a recipient of a 2012 Plan ADO scholarship.

References

External links 
 
 

1972 births
Living people
Spanish male cyclists
Paralympic cyclists of Spain
Paralympic gold medalists for Spain
Paralympic silver medalists for Spain
Paralympic bronze medalists for Spain
Paralympic medalists in cycling
Cyclists at the 2000 Summer Paralympics
Cyclists at the 2004 Summer Paralympics
Cyclists at the 2008 Summer Paralympics
Cyclists at the 2012 Summer Paralympics
Cyclists at the 2020 Summer Paralympics
Medalists at the 2000 Summer Paralympics
Medalists at the 2004 Summer Paralympics
Medalists at the 2008 Summer Paralympics
Medalists at the 2012 Summer Paralympics
Cyclists from Barcelona
Plan ADOP alumni